The girls' super-G competition of the alpine skiing events at the 2012 Winter Youth Olympics in Innsbruck, Austria, was held on January 14, at Patscherkofel. 44 athletes from 36 different countries took part in this event.

Result 
The race started at 10:45.

References

Alpine skiing at the 2012 Winter Youth Olympics
Youth